Maitland Glacier is a glacier flowing along the west flank of the Hitchcock Heights into Mobiloil Inlet, on the east coast of the Antarctic Peninsula. This glacier may appear indistinctly in an aerial photograph taken by Sir Hubert Wilkins on his flight of December 20, 1928, but it was more clearly shown in aerial photographs taken by Lincoln Ellsworth in 1935 and by the United States Antarctic Service in 1940. It was named by the Advisory Committee on Antarctic Names in 1952 for Osborn Maitland Miller of the American Geographical Society, who by utilizing Wilkins' and Ellsworth's photographs assisted in constructing the first reconnaissance map of this area.

References
Notes

Sources

Glaciers of Graham Land
Bowman Coast